Richard Wang may refer to:

 Richard Wang (chess player) (born 1998), Canadian chess player
 Richard Wang (athlete) (born 1947), dragon boat racer and sport shooter
 Richard Y. Wang, executive director of MIT CDOIQ program